Thomas Vicari (born August 24, 1948) is an American recording engineer, mixing engineer, record producer and scoring mixer known for his work with Quincy Jones, Gino Vannelli, Nicholas Britell, Thomas Newman, Prince, George Duke and Barbra Streisand. He was the sound mixer for TV shows and films including Six Feet Under, The Newsroom, Behind the Candelabra, Phantom of the Paradise, Finding Nemo, Finding Dory, Wall-E and Road to Perdition.

He has been the sound mixer for the Oscars telecast since 1996, commissioned by that year's executive producer, Quincy Jones. Vicari has won two Grammy Awards, eight Emmy Awards  and two Cinema Audio Society Awards.

Early life 
Vicari grew up in Southern California. His mother was a singer and his uncles were musicians, exposing him to artists like Frank Sinatra and Nat King Cole from an early age. During his teenage years, he was drawn by artists of the British Invasion, especially The Beatles.

Career 
Vicari started his career at Capitol Records in the early 1970s. After completing a three-month engineering apprenticeship program at A&M Studios, he became assistant engineer and later recording engineer. During his time at A&M, Vicari recorded artists including Barbra Streisand, Cat Stevens and Joni Mitchell.

After four years at A&M, Vicari became staff engineer at Sound Labs. In 1976, he became an independent engineer, recording at different locations including Conway Recording Studios, Record Plant and Lion Share Recording Studios. Vicari was executive producer and recording engineer on Prince's 1978 debut album For You, recorded at Record Plant in Sausalito, California.

Vicari worked on film since the early stages of his career. In 1971, he was credited as part of the sound department on Joe Cocker's concert film Mad Dogs & Englishmen. He was scoring mixer on the 1974 film Phantom of the Paradise directed by Brian De Palma and the 1976 film A Star Is Born directed by Frank Pierson.

In 1996, he was commissioned by Quincy Jones, executive producer of the 68th Academy Awards, to mix the sound for the telecast. Vicari continues to mix the live orchestra at the Academy Awards ceremony to this day.

After mixing the 68th Academy Awards, Vicari mixed a track composed by Thomas Newman for the 1998 film Meet Joe Black, directed by Martin Brest. The track was ultimately not used in the film. In 2001, Vicari mixed the main theme for the TV series Six Feet Under, also composed by Newman. Vicari continued working with Newman on films including Cinderella Man, Jarhead, Wall-E and Bridge of Spies.

In March 2005, Vicari founded his own production company, Vicari Sound Organization (VSO). The 2019 album Almost Midnight by Italian artist Filippo Perbellini was produced by Vicari for VSO and features Abraham Laboriel on bass, Steve Ferrone on drums, Luis Conte on percussion.

A significant part of Vicari's career has been dedicated to working with Italian artists including Laura Pausini, Eros Ramazzotti, Pino Daniele, Umberto Tozzi, Raf and Giorgia. He is credited on the albums Dove c'è musica by Eros Ramazzotti and La mia risposta by Laura Pausini, both of which reached number 1 on the Italian Albums Chart and on "Tutto Tozzi" by Umberto Tozzi which was gold certified by the Federazione Industria Musicale Italiana.

Awards

Grammy Awards

Emmy Awards

Cinema Audio Society Awards

Online Film & Television Association Awards

References 

Living people
People from Erie, Pennsylvania
Grammy Award winners
American audio engineers
1948 births